The Szczecin–Świnoujście railway is a Polish 100-kilometre long railway line, that connects Szczecin with the port in Świnoujście. The railway is part of European TEN-T route E59 from Scandinavia to Vienna, Budapest and Prague. For this reason the classification of the PLK line is also in the "first-class" category.

Opening
The first section of the line from Szczecin to Goleniow was built as part of Line 402 to Gryfice was built by Altdamm-Colberger Eisenbahn-Gesellschaft (ACE), which put the line into use in 1882. Ten years later, the line was extended from Goleniów to Wolin by the Preußische Ostbahn, or Prussian Eastern Railway in English. After the nationalisation of the Preußische Ostbahn in 1888, the next section was built under the banner of Preußische Staatseisenbahnen, before the end of the nineteenth century. In 1899, the line was extended to Międzyzdroje, and a year later to Swinoujscie. In 1901, the station in Swinoujscie (on the island of Wolin) was connected by a railway ferry crossing to the station Swinemünde Hauptbahnhof (Świnoujście Main Station) on the island of Usedom.

Between 1945 and 1948 trains could not operate between Recław and Wolin, because the bridge over the River Dziwna had been destroyed. Because of the Oder–Neisse line, in the Potsdam Agreement the line came under the ownership of the Polish State Railways. Following the War a ferry service was started from Świnoujście to Ystad in Sweden. In 1950 the railway line was extended a short distance to Świnoujście Port, to the ferry terminal. Only a few trains travel to the port station, the majority finishing at Świnoujście station.

Electrification
In December 1979, electrification of the line from Szczecin to Goleniów was completed and in 1980 the rest of the line was electrified.

Route
Most of the route (93.5%), is double track.

Between the signal boxes "SDA" (on the Poznań–Szczecin railway from / to Stargard ) and "SDC" (Szczecin–Świnoujście) is a track, No. 857, which is used by trains between Goleniów and Stargard without having to change direction in Szczecin.

Modernisation
In 2016 it is planned to modernise the Szczecin Dąbie - Kliniska and Rurka - Goleniów sections, which will increase line capacity and increase line speeds to 160 km/h.

Usage

Past
The German train timetable for the line shows that in 1917 the line was served by five train pairs per day between Szczecin and Świnoujście.

In 1981, 12 train pairs of passenger trains, and 5 pairs of fast trains which operated during the holiday season, operated on the line. Only 1 pair of trains ran to the station Świnoujście Port. One train pair operated to Kamien Pomorski and five train pairs operated to Gryfic from Goleniów.

Current
The line is used by the following trains:

Intercity trains between Świnoujście and Szczecin, continuing to various parts of Poland, including Warsaw, Wrocław, Katowice and Krakow. 
Regional trains between Świnoujście (Port) and Szczecin, with most of these continuing to Poznań.

See also 
 Railway lines of Poland

References

 This article is based upon a translation of the Polish language version as of October 2016.

External links 

Railway lines in Poland
Railway lines opened in 1882